The Union for the Principality (or UP) was a centrist political party in Monaco. It was part of the center-right coalition Horizon Monaco, which won 50.34% of the popular vote, and 20 out of 24 seats in the National Council at the 2013 general election.

External links

Union for the Principality on Twitter

Defunct political parties in Monaco
Monarchist parties in Monaco
Political parties disestablished in 2020